WMTL (870 AM) is a radio station  broadcasting a country music format. Licensed to Leitchfield, Kentucky, United States, the station is owned by Heritage Media of Kentucky, Inc. It features programming from Fox News Radio and Fox Sports Radio.

History 
The station began broadcasting on January 17, 1959. Under license by the FCC and under ownership by Rough River Broadcasting, Inc., it was Grayson County's first radio station. For its first 29 years on the air, the station broadcast with 250 watts on a frequency of 1580 kilohertz. From 1967 until 1978, all of the station's programming was simulcast over WMTL-FM (now WKHG) at 104.9 MHz. For most of its history to this day, WMTL broadcasts a country music format.

In 1988, the station moved to its current frequency of 870 kHz, and increased its transmitter power to 500 watts. In 1994, Rough River Broadcasting was acquired by Heritage Media of Kentucky, taking WMTL and WKHG with it. In the 2010s, WMTL became available on the FM dial through translator W280FH.

References

External links

Country radio stations in Kentucky
MTL
Leitchfield, Kentucky
Radio stations established in 1959
1959 establishments in Kentucky
MTL